Nathan Tisam (born 6 July 1988) in the Cook Islands is a footballer who plays as a defender. He currently plays for Nikao Sokattack F.C. in the Cook Islands Round Cup and the Cook Islands national football team.

Career statistics

International

Statistics accurate as of match played 2 September 2015

Honours
Nikao Sokattak
Cook Islands Round Cup (2): 2008, 2009
Cook Islands Cup (4): 2008, 2010, 2011, 2012

References

1988 births
Living people
Cook Islands international footballers
Association football defenders
Cook Island footballers